Hasan Masood aka Kala Manik (born December 16, 1962) is a Bangladeshi actor. He is also a former journalist and military officer.

Early life
Masood was born in Barisal, but he was brought up in the city of Dhaka. He completed his SSC from BAF Shaheen School, Dhaka and his HSC from the Government Titumir College in Dhaka.

Career
Hasan has been singing from an early age and he had completed a 5-year course on Nazrul Sangeet from Chhayanaut. Hasan joined the Bangladesh Army in 1983 and commissioned   from 11 BMA long course on 21 December 1984 in the corps of infantry and retired as a captain in 1992. He then worked as a sports correspondent at The New Nation and later in 1995, at The Daily Star, and was also a correspondent of world service in the Bengali affiliate of the British Broadcasting Corporation from February 2004 to 2008.

Hasan was approached by Mostofa Sarwar Farooki to play a role in his film Bachelor in February 2003. Hasan took a leave from his position at The Daily Star and started his acting career. The film was released in February 2004. He later acted in the film Made in Bangladesh. His acted television drama plays include 69,  "House Full," "Taxi Driver," "FDC", "Bou","Khunshuti", "Graduate", "Ranger Duniya", "Amader Shangshar", " Gani Shaheber Shesh Kichhudin" and "Batasher Ghor".

Hasan also voiced the soundtrack Ajke Na Hoy Valobasho in the film Bachelor, which is originally a song by Khurshid Alam, written by Dewan Nazrul and composed by Alam Khan. His first music album, Hridoy Ghotito released on the Valentine's Day 2006. Marzuk Russell wrote all of 10 songs on the album, and Sanjeeb Choudhury composed the tunes with Bappa Mazumdar as the arranger of the music.

Filmography

Films

Television

Playback

Web series

Discography

Solo

Film scores

References

External links

1962 births
Living people
Bangladeshi male film actors
Bangladeshi journalists
Bangladeshi film directors
21st-century Bangladeshi male singers
21st-century Bangladeshi singers
21st-century Bangladeshi male actors
People from Barisal
People from Dhaka
Bangladesh Army officers